A thought leader has been described as an individual or firm recognized as an authority in a specific field and also as business jargon.

Meanings

Go-to expert
From the perspective of a thought leader as the 'go-to expert', being a thought leader means to consistently answer the biggest questions on the minds of the target audience on a particular topic. Thought leaders are commonly asked to speak at public events, conferences, or webinars to share their insight with a relevant audience. In a 1990 Wall Street Journal Marketing section article, Patrick Reilly used the term "thought leader publications" to refer to such magazines as Harper's.

In the previous decade, the term was revived and re-engineered by marketers.

Criticism of the phrase and concept
The phrase "thought leader" is identified by some writers as an annoying example of business jargon. Kevin Money and Nuno Da Camara of the John Madejski Centre for Reputation at the University of Reading's Henley Management College write that the nebulous nature of the phrase (the unclear nature of "what is and what is not thought leadership") contributes to its reputation among cynics as "meaningless management speak."  Some writers, such as Harvard Business Review contributor Dorie Clark, have defended the phrase while agreeing "that it is very icky when people call themselves thought leaders because that sounds a little bit egomaniacal."  New York Times columnist David Brooks mocked the lifecycle of the role in a satirical column entitled "The Thought Leader," published in December 2013.

A parody on the term was published in 2016 by Pat Kelly on Canadian television's This Is That program. In the process of the discussion, imitating TED talks, Kelly elicits responses from the audience that exemplify the effect he describes as the result of applying well-known marketing techniques to achieve the impression of being an erudite speaker.

See also 

 Buzzword
 Charismatic authority
 Creative class
 Futures studies
 Opinion leadership

References

Further reading 
 Brosseau, Denise (2014), Ready to Be a Thought Leader? (Wiley/Jossey-Bass)
Karin Frick, Detlef Guertler, Peter A. Gloor, (2013), Coolhunting for the World's Thought Leaders, Presented at COINs13 Conference, Chile, 2013 arXiv
 
 Myslewski, Rik (November 25, 2009). "Apple tops Google as UK 'Thought Leader'. The Register.

Neologisms
Systems thinking